Konrad Hermann Joseph Adenauer (5 January 1876 – 19 April 1967) was a German statesman who served as the first chancellor of the Federal Republic of Germany from 1949 to 1963. From 1946 to 1966, he was the first leader of the Christian Democratic Union (CDU), a Christian-democratic party he co-founded, which became the dominant force in the country under his leadership.

A devout Roman Catholic and member of the Catholic Centre Party, Adenauer was a leading politician in the Weimar Republic, serving as Mayor of Cologne (1917–1933) and as president of the Prussian State Council (1922–1933). In the early years of the Federal Republic, he switched focus from denazification to recovery, and led his country from the ruins of World War II to becoming a productive and prosperous nation that forged close relations with France, the United Kingdom and the United States. During his years in power, West Germany achieved democracy, stability, international respect and economic prosperity, undergoing the Wirtschaftswunder (German for "economic miracle").

Adenauer belied his age by his intense work habits and his uncanny political instinct. He displayed a strong dedication to a broad vision of market-based liberal democracy and anti-communism. A shrewd and strategic politician, Adenauer was deeply committed to an Atlanticist foreign policy and restoring the position of West Germany on the world stage. He worked to restore the West German economy from the destruction of World War II to a central position in Europe, presiding over the German economic miracle together with his Minister of Economics, Ludwig Erhard, and was a driving force in re-establishing national military forces (the Bundeswehr) and intelligence services (the Bundesnachrichtendienst) in West Germany in 1955 and 1956. Adenauer opposed recognition of the rival German Democratic Republic or the Oder–Neisse line. He skillfully used these points in electoral campaigns against the SPD, which was more sympathetic to co-existence with the GDR and the post-war borders. Adenauer made West Germany a member of NATO. A proponent of European unity, Adenauer was one of the founders of the European Union, and a key signatory of the Treaty of Rome; he also pursued Atlanticist links with the United States as a counterbalance.

Adenauer, who resigned as Chancellor at the age of 87 and remained head of the governing CDU until his retirement at 90, was often dubbed "Der Alte" ("the old one"). He also remained a Member of the Bundestag
for Bonn until his death in 1967 at the age of 91. According to British politician Roy Jenkins, he was "the oldest statesman ever to function in elected office" and the oldest head of government of a major country in modern European history. As of 2021, Adenauer remains the oldest-ever European head of government and one of the oldest elected European statesmen (paralleled only by Sandro Pertini and Giorgio Napolitano); however, the governments of Tunisia and Malaysia had older heads of government during the 2010s.

Cologne years

Early life and education 

Konrad Adenauer was born as the third of five children of Johann Konrad Adenauer (1833–1906) and his wife Helene (née Scharfenberg; 1849–1919) in Cologne, Rhenish Prussia, on 5 January 1876. His siblings were August (1872–1952), Johannes (1873–1937), Lilli (1879–1950) and Elisabeth, who died shortly after birth  1880. One of the formative influences of Adenauer's youth was the Kulturkampf, an experience that as related to him by his parents left him with a lifelong dislike for "Prussianism", and led him like many other Catholic Rhinelanders of the 19th century to deeply resent the Rhineland's inclusion in Prussia.

In 1894, he completed his Abitur and began studying law and politics at the universities of Freiburg, Munich and Bonn. In 1896, at the age of 20, he was mustered for the Prussian army, but did not pass the physical exam due to chronic respiratory problems he had experienced since childhood. He was a member of several Roman Catholic students' associations under the K.St.V. Arminia Bonn in Bonn. He graduated in 1900, and afterwards worked as a lawyer at the court in Cologne.

Leader in Cologne 

As a devout Catholic, he joined the Centre Party ( or just ) in 1906 and was elected to Cologne's city council in the same year. In 1909, he became Vice-Mayor of Cologne, an industrial metropolis with a population of 635,000 in 1914. Avoiding the extreme political movements that attracted so many of his generation, Adenauer was committed to bourgeois decency, diligence, order, Christian morals and values, and was dedicated to rooting out disorder, inefficiency, irrationality and political immorality. From 1917 to 1933, he served as Mayor of Cologne and became a member of the Prussian House of Lords.

Adenauer headed Cologne during World War I, working closely with the army to maximize the city's role as a rear base of supply and transportation for the Western Front. He paid special attention to the civilian food supply, enabling the residents to avoid the worst of the severe shortages that beset most German cities during 1918–19. In 1918, he invented a soy-based sausage called the Cologne sausage to help feed the city. In the face of the collapse of the old regime and the threat of revolution and widespread disorder in late 1918, Adenauer maintained control in Cologne using his good working relationship with the Social Democrats. In a speech on 1 February 1919 Adenauer called for the dissolution of Prussia, and for the Prussian Rhineland to become a new autonomous Land (state) in the Reich. Adenauer claimed this was the only way to prevent France from annexing the Rhineland. Both the Reich and Prussian governments were completely against Adenauer's plans for breaking up Prussia. When the terms of the Treaty of Versailles were presented to Germany in June 1919, Adenauer again suggested to Berlin his plan for an autonomous Rhineland state and again his plans were rejected by the Reich government.

He was mayor during the postwar British occupation. He established a good working relationship with the British military authorities, using them to neutralize the workers' and soldiers' council that had become an alternative base of power for the city's left wing. During the Weimar Republic, he was president of the Prussian State Council from 1921 to 1933, which was the representation of the provinces of Prussia in its legislature. A major debate had occurred within the Zentrum since 1906 regarding the question of whether the Zentrum should "leave the tower" (i.e. allow Protestants to join to become a multi-faith party) or "stay in the tower" (i.e. continue to be a Catholic-only party). Adenauer was one of the leading advocates of "leaving the tower", which led to a dramatic clash between him and Cardinal Michael von Faulhaber at the 1922 Katholikentag, the annual meeting of German Catholics, where the Cardinal publicly admonished Adenauer for wanting to take the Zentrum "out of the tower".

In mid-October 1923, the Chancellor Gustav Stresemann announced that Berlin would cease all financial payments to the Rhineland and that the new Rentenmark, which had replaced the now worthless Mark would not circulate in the Rhineland. To save the Rhineland economy, Adenauer opened talks with the French High Commissioner Paul Tirard in late October 1923 for a Rhenish republic in a sort of economic union with France which would achieve Franco-German reconciliation, which Adenauer called a "grand design". At the same time, Adenauer clung to the hope that the Rentenmark might still circulate in the Rhineland. Adenauer's plans came to naught when Stresemann, who was resolutely opposed to Adenauer's "grand design", which he viewed as borderline treason, was able to negotiate an end to the crisis on his own.

In 1926, the Zentrum suggested that Adenauer become Chancellor, an offer that he was interested in but ultimately rejected when the German People's Party insisted that one of the conditions for entering into a coalition under Adenauer's leadership was that Gustav Stresemann stay on as Foreign Minister. Adenauer, who disliked Stresemann as "too Prussian," rejected that condition, which marked the end of his chance of becoming Chancellor in 1926.

Years under the Nazi government 
Nazi Party candidates made significant electoral gains in municipal, state and national elections in 1930 and 1932. Adenauer, as mayor of Cologne and president of the Prussian State Council, still believed that improvements in the national economy would make his strategy work: ignore the Nazis and concentrate on the Communist threat. Adenauer thought that based on election returns, the Nazis should become part of the Prussian and Reich governments, even when he was already the target of intense personal attacks. Political manoeuvrings around the aging President Hindenburg then brought the Nazis to power on 30 January 1933.

By early February, Adenauer finally realized the futility of all discussions and any attempts at compromise with the Nazis. Cologne's city council and the Prussian parliament had been dissolved; on 4 April 1933, he was officially dismissed as mayor and his bank accounts were frozen. "He had no money, no home and no job." After arranging for the safety of his family, he appealed to the abbot of the Benedictine monastery at Maria Laach for a stay of several months. According to Albert Speer in his book Spandau: The Secret Diaries, Hitler expressed admiration for Adenauer, noting his civic projects, the building of a road circling the city as a bypass, and a "green belt" of parks. However, both Hitler and Speer concluded that Adenauer's political views and principles made it impossible for him to play any role in Nazi Germany.

Adenauer was imprisoned for two days after the Night of the Long Knives on 30 June 1934; however, on 10 August 1934, maneuvering for his pension, he wrote a ten-page letter to Hermann Göring, the Prussian interior minister. He stated that as Mayor he had violated Prussian laws in order to allow NSDAP events in public buildings and Nazi flags to be flown from city flagpoles, and that in 1932 he had declared publicly that the Nazis should join the Reich government in a leading role. At the end of 1932, Adenauer had indeed demanded a joint government by his Zentrum party and the Nazis for Prussia.

During the next two years, Adenauer changed residences often for fear of reprisals against him, while living on the benevolence of friends. With the help of lawyers in August 1937 he was successful in claiming a pension; he received a cash settlement for his house, which had been taken over by the city of Cologne; his unpaid mortgage, penalties and taxes were waived. With reasonable financial security he managed to live in seclusion for some years. After the failed assassination attempt on Hitler of July 1944, he was imprisoned for a second time as an opponent of the regime. He fell ill and credited Eugen Zander, a former municipal worker in Cologne and a communist, with saving his life. Zander, then a section Kapo of a labor camp near Bonn, discovered Adenauer's name on a deportation list to the East and managed to get him admitted to a hospital. Adenauer was subsequently rearrested (as was his wife), but in the absence of any evidence against him, was released from prison at Brauweiler in November 1944.

After World War II and the founding of the CDU 

Shortly after the war ended, the American occupation forces once again installed him as Mayor of Cologne, which had been heavily bombed. After the city was transferred into the British zone of occupation, however, the Director of its military government, General Gerald Templer, dismissed Adenauer for incompetence in December 1945. Adenauer considered the Germans the political equals of the occupying Allies, a view that angered Templer. Adenauer's dismissal by the British contributed much to his subsequent political success and allowed him to pursue a policy of alliance with the occupying Allies in the 1950s without facing charges of being a "sell-out".

After being dismissed, Adenauer devoted himself to building a new political party, the Christian Democratic Union (CDU), which he hoped would embrace both Protestants and Catholics in a single party. According to Adenauer, a Catholic-only party would lead to German politics being dominated by anti-democratic parties yet again. In January 1946, Adenauer initiated a political meeting of the future CDU in the British zone in his role as doyen (the oldest man in attendance, Alterspräsident) and was informally confirmed as its leader. During the Weimar Republic, Adenauer had often been considered a future Chancellor and after 1945, his claims for leadership were even stronger. The other surviving Zentrum leaders were considered unsuitable for the tasks that lay ahead.

Reflecting his background as a Catholic Rhinelander who had long chafed under Prussian rule, Adenauer believed that Prussianism was the root cause of National Socialism, and that only by driving out Prussianism could Germany become a democracy. In a December 1946 letter, Adenauer wrote that the Prussian state in the early 19th century had become an "almost God-like entity" that valued state power over the rights of individuals. Adenauer's dislike of Prussia even led him to oppose Berlin as a future capital.

Adenauer viewed the most important battle in the postwar world as between the forces of Christianity and Marxism, especially Communism. Marxism meant both the Communists and the Social Democrats as the latter were officially a Marxist party until the Bad Godesberg conference of 1959. The same anti-Marxist viewpoints led Adenauer to denounce the Social Democrats as the heirs to Prussianism and National Socialism. Adenauer's ideology was at odds with many in the CDU, who wished to unite socialism and Christianity. Adenauer worked diligently at building up contacts and support in the CDU over the following years, and he sought with varying success to impose his particular ideology on the party.

Adenauer's leading role in the CDU of the British zone won him a position at the Parliamentary Council of 1948, which had been called into existence by the Western Allies to draft a constitution for the three western zones of Germany. He was the chairman of this constitutional convention and vaulted from this position to being chosen as the first head of government once the new "Basic Law" had been promulgated in May 1949.

Chancellor of West Germany

First government 

The first election to the Bundestag of West Germany was held on 15 August 1949, with the Christian Democrats emerging as the strongest party. There were two clashing visions of a future Germany held by Adenauer and his main rival, the Social Democrat Kurt Schumacher. Adenauer favored integrating the Federal Republic with other Western states, especially France and the United States in order to fight the Cold War, even if the price of this was the continued division of Germany. Schumacher by contrast, though an anti-communist, wanted to see a united, socialist and neutral Germany. As such, Adenauer was in favor of joining NATO, something that Schumacher was strongly opposed to.

The Free Democrat Theodor Heuss was elected the first President of the Republic, and Adenauer was elected Chancellor (head of government) on 15 September 1949 with the support of his own CDU, the Christian Social Union, the liberal Free Democratic Party, and the right-wing German Party. It was said that Adenauer was elected Chancellor by the new German parliament by "a majority of one vote – his own". At age 73, it was thought that Adenauer would only be a caretaker Chancellor. However, he would go on to hold this post for 14 years, a period spanning most of the preliminary phase of the Cold War. During this period, the post-war division of Germany was consolidated with the establishment of two separate German states, the Federal Republic of Germany (West Germany) and the German Democratic Republic (East Germany).

In the controversial selection for a "provisional capital" of the Federal Republic of Germany, Adenauer championed Bonn over Frankfurt am Main. The British had agreed to detach Bonn from their zone of occupation and convert the area to an autonomous region wholly under German sovereignty; the Americans were not prepared to grant the same for Frankfurt. He also resisted the claims of Heidelberg, which had better communications and had survived the war in better condition; partly because the Nazis had been popular there before they came to power and partly, as he said, because the world would not take them seriously if they set up their state in a city that was the setting for The Student Prince, at the time a popular American operetta based on the drinking culture of German student fraternities.

As chancellor, Adenauer tended to make most major decisions himself, treating his ministers as mere extensions of his authority. While this tendency decreased under his successors, it established the image of West Germany (and later reunified Germany) as a "chancellor democracy".

Ending Denazification 
In a speech on 20 September 1949, Adenauer denounced the entire denazification process pursued by the Allied military governments, announcing in the same speech that he was planning to bring in an amnesty law for the Nazi war criminals and he planned to apply to "the High Commissioners for a corresponding amnesty for punishments imposed by the Allied military courts". Adenauer argued the continuation of denazification would "foster a growing and extreme nationalism" as the millions who supported the Nazi regime would find themselves excluded from German life forever. He also demanded an "end to this sniffing out of Nazis." By 31 January 1951, the amnesty legislation had benefited 792,176 people. They included 3,000 functionaries of the SA, the SS, and the Nazi Party who participated in dragging victims to jails and camps; 20,000 Nazis sentenced for "deeds against life" (presumably murder); 30,000 sentenced for causing bodily injury, and about 5,200 charged with "crimes and misdemeanors in office.

Opposition to the Oder–Neisse Line 
The Adenauer government refused to accept the Oder–Neisse line as Germany's eastern frontier. This refusal was in large part motivated by his desire to win the votes of expellees and right-wing nationalists to the CDU, which is why he supported , i.e. the right of expellees to return to their former homes. It was also intended to be a deal-breaker if negotiations ever began to reunite Germany on terms that Adenauer considered unfavorable such as the neutralization of Germany as Adenauer knew well that the Soviets would never revise the Oder–Neisse line. Privately, Adenauer considered Germany's eastern provinces to be lost forever.

Advocacy for European Coal and Steel Community 
At the Petersberg Agreement in November 1949 he achieved some of the first concessions granted by the Allies, such as a decrease in the number of factories to be dismantled, but in particular his agreement to join the International Authority for the Ruhr led to heavy criticism. In the following debate in parliament Adenauer stated:
The Allies have told me that dismantling would be stopped only if I satisfy the Allied desire for security, does the Socialist Party want dismantling to go on to the bitter end?
The opposition leader Kurt Schumacher responded by labeling Adenauer "Chancellor of the Allies", accusing Adenauer of putting good relations with the West for the sake of the Cold War ahead of German national interests.

After a year of negotiations, the Treaty of Paris was signed on 18 April 1951 establishing the European Coal and Steel Community. The treaty was unpopular in Germany where it was seen as a French attempt to take over German industry. The treaty conditions were favorable to the French, but for Adenauer, the only thing that mattered was European integration. Adenauer was keen to see Britain join the European Coal and Steel Community as he believed the more free-market British would counterbalance the influence of the more dirigiste French, and to achieve that purpose he visited London in November 1951 to meet with Prime Minister Winston Churchill. Churchill said Britain would not join the European Coal and Steel Community because doing so would mean sacrificing relations with the U.S. and Commonwealth.

German Rearmament 
From the beginning of his Chancellorship, Adenauer had been pressing for German rearmament. After the outbreak of the Korean War on 25 June 1950, the U.S. and Britain agreed that West Germany had to be rearmed to strengthen the defenses of Western Europe against a possible Soviet invasion. Further contributing to the crisis atmosphere of 1950 was the bellicose rhetoric of the East German leader Walter Ulbricht, who proclaimed the reunification of Germany under communist rule to be imminent. To soothe French fears of German rearmament, the French Premier René Pleven suggested the so-called Pleven plan in October 1950 under which the Federal Republic would have its military forces function as part of the armed wing of the multinational European Defense Community (EDC). Adenauer deeply disliked the "Pleven plan", but was forced to support it when it became clear that this plan was the only way the French would agree to German rearmament.

Amnesty and Employment of Nazis 
In 1950, a major controversy broke out when it emerged that Adenauer's State Secretary Hans Globke had played a major role in drafting anti-semitic Nuremberg Race Laws in Nazi Germany. Adenauer kept Globke on as State Secretary as part of his strategy of integration. Starting in August 1950, Adenauer began to pressure the Western Allies to free all of the war criminals in their custody, especially those from the Wehrmacht, whose continued imprisonment he claimed made West German rearmament impossible. Adenauer had been opposed to the Nuremberg Trials in 1945–46, and after becoming Chancellor, he demanded the release of the so-called "Spandau Seven," as the seven war criminals convicted at Nuremberg and imprisoned at Spandau Prison were known.

In October 1950, Adenauer received the so-called "Himmerod memorandum" drafted by four former Wehrmacht generals at the Himmerod Abbey that linked freedom for German war criminals as the price of German rearmament, along with public statements from the Allies that the Wehrmacht committed no war crimes in World War II. The Allies were willing to do whatever necessary to get the much-needed German rearmament underway, and in January 1951, General Dwight Eisenhower, commander of NATO forces, issued a statement which declared the great majority of the Wehrmacht had acted honorably.

On 2 January 1951, Adenauer met with the American High Commissioner, John J. McCloy, to argue that executing the Landsberg prisoners would ruin forever any effort at having the Federal Republic play its role in the Cold War. At the time, American occupation authorities had 28 Nazi war criminals left on death row in their custody.  In response to Adenauer's demands and pressure from the German public, McCloy and Thomas T. Handy on 31 January 1951 reduced the death sentences of all but the 7 worst offenders.

By 1951 laws were passed by the Bundestag ending denazification. Denazification was viewed by the United States as counterproductive and ineffective, and its demise was not opposed. Adenauer's intention was to switch government policy to reparations and compensation for the victims of Nazi rule (Wiedergutmachung).

Officials were allowed to retake jobs in civil service, with the exception of people assigned to Group I (Major Offenders) and II (Offenders) during the denazification review process. Adenauer pressured his rehabilitated ex-Nazis by threatening that stepping out of line could trigger the reopening of individual de-Nazification prosecutions. The construction of a "competent Federal Government effectively from a standing start was one of the greatest of Adenauer's formidable achievements".

Contemporary critics accused Adenauer of cementing the division of Germany, sacrificing reunification and the recovery of territories lost in the westward shift of Poland and the Soviet Union with his determination to secure the Federal Republic to the West. Adenauer's German policy was based upon Politik der Stärke (Policy of Strength), and upon the so-called "magnet theory", in which a prosperous, democratic West Germany integrated with the West would act as a "magnet" that would eventually bring down the East German regime.

Rejecting the Reunification Offer 
In 1952, the Stalin Note, as it became known, "caught everybody in the West by surprise". It offered to unify the two German entities into a single, neutral state with its own, non-aligned national army to effect superpower disengagement from Central Europe. Adenauer and his cabinet were unanimous in their rejection of the Stalin overture; they shared the Western Allies' suspicion about the genuineness of that offer and supported the Allies in their cautious replies. Adenauer's flat rejection was, however, still out of step with public opinion; he then realized his mistake and he started to ask questions. Critics denounced him for having missed an opportunity for German reunification. The Soviets sent a second note, courteous in tone. Adenauer by then understood that "all opportunity for initiative had passed out of his hands," and the matter was put to rest by the Allies. Given the realities of the Cold War, German reunification and recovery of lost territories in the east were not realistic goals as both of Stalin's notes specified the retention of the existing "Potsdam"-decreed boundaries of Germany.

Reparation to victims of Nazi Germany 
Adenauer recognized the obligation of the West German government to compensate Israel, as the main representative of the Jewish people, for The Holocaust. West Germany started negotiations with Israel for restitution of lost property and the payment of damages to victims of Nazi persecution. Jewish claims were bundled in the Jewish Claims Conference, which represented the Jewish victims of Nazi Germany. West Germany then initially paid about 3 billion Mark to Israel and about 450 million to the Claims Conference, although payments continued after that, as new claims were made. In the face of severe opposition both from the public and from his own cabinet, Adenauer was only able to get the reparations agreement ratified by the Bundestag with the support of the SPD. Israeli public opinion was divided over accepting the money, but ultimately the fledgling state under David Ben-Gurion agreed to take it, opposed by more radical groups like Irgun, who were against such treaties. Those treaties were cited as a main reason for the assassination attempt by the radical Jewish groups against Adenauer.

Assassination Attempt 
On 27 March 1952, a package addressed to Chancellor Adenauer exploded in the Munich Police Headquarters, killing one Bavarian police officer, Karl Reichert. Investigations revealed the mastermind behind the assassination attempt was Menachem Begin, who would later become the Prime Minister of Israel. Begin had been the commander of Irgun and at that time headed Herut and was a member of the Knesset. His goal was to put pressure on the German government and prevent the signing of the Reparations Agreement between Israel and West Germany, which he vehemently opposed. The West German government kept all proof under seal in order to prevent antisemitic responses from the German public.

Second government 

When the East German uprising of 1953 was harshly suppressed by the Red Army in June 1953, Adenauer took political advantage of the situation and was handily re-elected to a second term as Chancellor. The CDU/CSU came up one seat short of an outright majority. Adenauer could thus have governed in a coalition with only one other party, but retained/gained the support of nearly all of the parties in the Bundestag that were to the right of the SPD. For all of his efforts as West Germany's leader, Adenauer was named Time magazine's Man of the Year in 1953. In 1954, he received the Karlspreis (English: Charlemagne Award), an award by the German city of Aachen to people who contributed to the European idea, European cooperation and European peace.

The German Restitution Laws were passed in 1953 that allowed some victims of Nazi prosecution to claim restitution. Under the 1953 restitution law, those who had suffered for "racial, religious or political reasons" could collect compensation, which were defined in such a way as to sharply limit the number of people entitled to collect compensation.

In the spring of 1954, opposition to the Pleven plan grew within the French National Assembly. The British Prime Minister Winston Churchill told Adenauer that Britain would ensure that West German rearmament would happen, regardless if the National Assembly ratified the EDC treaty or not. In August 1954, the Pleven plan died when an alliance of conservatives and Communists in the National Assembly joined forces to reject the EDC treaty under the grounds that West German rearmament in any form was an unacceptable danger to France.

British Foreign Secretary Anthony Eden used the failure of the EDC to argue for independent West German rearmament and West German NATO membership. Thanks in part to Adenauer's success in rebuilding West Germany's image, the British proposal met with considerable approval. In the ensuing London conference, Eden assisted Adenauer by promising the French that Britain would always maintain at least four divisions in the British Army of the Rhine as long as there was a Soviet threat, with the strengthened British forces also aimed implicitly against any German revanchism. Adenauer then promised that Germany would never seek to have nuclear, chemical and biological weapons as well as capital ships, strategic bombers, long-range artillery, and guided missiles, although these promises were non-binding. The French had been assuaged that West German rearmament would be no threat to France. Additionally, Adenauer promised that the West German military would be under the operational control of NATO general staff, though ultimate control would rest with the West German government; and that above all he would never violate the strictly defensive NATO charter and invade East Germany to achieve German reunification.

To achieve these aims, Adenauer gave a great deal of power to the military reformer Wolf Graf von Baudissin.

In November 1954, Adenauer's lobbying efforts on behalf of the "Spandau Seven" finally bore fruit with the release of Konstantin von Neurath. Adenauer congratulated Neurath on his release, sparking controversy all over the world. At the same time, Adenauer's efforts to win freedom for Admiral Karl Dönitz ran into staunch opposition from the British Permanent Secretary at the Foreign Office, Ivone Kirkpatrick, who argued Dönitz would be an active danger to German democracy. Adenauer then traded with Kirkpatrick no early release for Admiral Dönitz with an early release for Admiral Erich Raeder on medical grounds.

Adenauer's achievements include the establishment of a stable democracy in West Germany and a lasting reconciliation with France, culminating in the Élysée Treaty. His political commitment to the Western powers achieved full sovereignty for West Germany, which was formally laid down in the General Treaty, although there remained Allied restrictions concerning the status of a potentially reunited Germany and the state of emergency in West Germany. Adenauer firmly integrated the country with the emerging Euro-Atlantic community (NATO and the Organisation for European Economic Cooperation). Adenauer is closely linked to the implementation of an enhanced pension system, which ensured unparalleled prosperity for retired people. The Adenauer era witnessed a dramatic rise in the standard of living of average Germans, with real wages doubling between 1950 and 1963. This rising affluence was accompanied by a 20% fall in working hours during that same period, together with a fall in the unemployment rate from 8% in 1950 to 0.4% in 1965. in addition, an advanced welfare state was established.

In return for the release of the last German prisoners of war in 1955, the Federal Republic established diplomatic relations with the USSR, but refused to recognize East Germany and broke off diplomatic relations with countries (e.g., Yugoslavia) that established relations with the East German régime. Adenauer was also ready to consider the Oder–Neisse line as the German border in order to pursue a more flexible policy with Poland but he did not command sufficient domestic support for this, and opposition to the Oder–Neisse line continued, causing considerable disappointment among Adenauer's Western allies.

In 1956, during the Suez Crisis, Adenauer fully supported the Anglo-French-Israeli attack on Egypt, arguing to his Cabinet that Egyptian President Gamal Abdel Nasser was a pro-Soviet force that needed to be cut down to size. Adenauer was appalled that the Americans had come out against the attack on Egypt alongside the Soviets, which led Adenauer to fear that the United States and Soviet Union would "carve up the world" with no thought for European interests.

At the height of the Suez crisis, Adenauer visited Paris to meet the French Premier Guy Mollet in a show of moral support for France. The day before Adenauer arrived in Paris, the Soviet Premier Nikolai Bulganin sent the so-called "Bulganin letters" to the leaders of Britain, France, and Israel threatening nuclear strikes if they did not end the war against Egypt. The news of the "Bulganin letters" reached Adenauer mid-way on the train trip to Paris. The threat of a Soviet nuclear strike that could destroy Paris at any moment added considerably to the tension of the summit. The Paris summit helped to strengthen the bond between Adenauer and the French, who saw themselves as fellow European powers living in a world dominated by Washington and Moscow.

Adenauer was deeply shocked by the Soviet threat of nuclear strikes against Britain and France, and even more so by the apparent quiescent American response to the Soviet threat of nuclear annihilation against two of NATO's key members. As a result, Adenauer became more interested in the French idea of a European "Third Force" in the Cold War as an alternative security policy. This helped to lead to the formation of the European Economic Community in 1957, which was intended to be the foundation stone of the European "Third Force".

Adenauer reached an agreement for his "nuclear ambitions" with a NATO Military Committee in December 1956 that stipulated West German forces were to be "equipped for nuclear warfare". Concluding that the United States would eventually pull out of Western Europe, Adenauer pursued nuclear cooperation with other countries. The French government then proposed that France, West Germany and Italy jointly develop and produce nuclear weapons and delivery systems, and an agreement was signed in April 1958. With the ascendancy of Charles de Gaulle, the agreement for joint production and control was shelved indefinitely. President John F. Kennedy, an ardent foe of nuclear proliferation, considered sales of such weapons moot since "in the event of war the United States would, from the outset, be prepared to defend the Federal Republic." The physicists of the Max Planck Institute for Theoretical Physics at Göttingen and other renowned universities would have had the scientific capability for in-house development, but the will was absent, nor was there public support. With Adenauer's fourth-term election in November 1961 and the end of his chancellorship in sight, his "nuclear ambitions" began to taper off.

Third government 

In 1957 the Saarland was reintegrated into Germany as a federal state of the Federal Republic. The election of 1957 essentially dealt with national matters. His re-election campaign centered around the slogan "No Experiments". Riding a wave of popularity from the return of the last POWs from Soviet labor camps, as well as an extensive pension reform, Adenauer led the CDU/CSU to an outright majority in a free German election. In 1957, the Federal Republic signed the Treaty of Rome and became a founding member of the European Economic Community. In September 1958, Adenauer first met President Charles de Gaulle of France, who was to become a close friend and ally in pursuing Franco-German rapprochement. Adenauer saw de Gaulle as a "rock" and the only foreign leader whom he could completely trust.

In response to the Ulm Einsatzkommando trial in 1958, Adenauer set up the Central Office of the State Justice Administrations for the Investigation of National Socialist Crimes.

On 27 November 1958 another Berlin crisis broke out when Khrushchev submitted an ultimatum with a six-month expiry date to Washington, London and Paris, where he demanded that the Allies pull all their forces out of West Berlin and agree that West Berlin become a "free city", or else he would sign a separate peace treaty with East Germany. Adenauer was opposed to any sort of negotiations with the Soviets, arguing if only the West were to hang tough long enough, Khrushchev would back down. As the 27 May deadline approached, the crisis was defused by the British Prime Minister Harold Macmillan, who visited Moscow to meet with Khrushchev and managed to extend the deadline while not committing himself or the other Western powers to concessions. Adenauer believed Macmillan to be a spineless "appeaser", who had made a secret deal with Khrushchev at the expense of the Federal Republic.

Adenauer tarnished his image when he announced he would run for the office of federal president in 1959, only to pull out when he discovered that under the Basic Law, the president had far less power than he did in the Weimar Republic. After his reversal he supported the nomination of Heinrich Lübke as the CDU presidential candidate whom he believed weak enough not to interfere with his actions as Federal Chancellor. One of Adenauer's reasons for not pursuing the presidency was his fear that Ludwig Erhard, whom Adenauer thought little of, would become the new chancellor.

By early 1959, Adenauer came under renewed pressure from his Western allies to recognize the Oder–Neisse line, with the Americans being especially insistent. Adenauer gave his "explicit and unconditional approval" to the idea of non-aggression pacts in late January 1959, which effectively meant recognising the Oder–Neisse line, since realistically speaking Germany could only regain the lost territories through force. After Adenauer's intention to sign non-aggression pacts with Poland and Czechoslovakia became clear, the German expellee lobby swung into action and organized protests all over the Federal Republic while bombarding the offices of Adenauer and other members of the cabinet with thousands of letters, telegrams and telephone calls promising never to vote CDU again if the non-aggression pacts were signed. Faced with this pressure, Adenauer promptly capitulated to the expellee lobby.

In late 1959, a controversy broke out when it emerged that Theodor Oberländer, the Minister of Refugees since 1953 and one of the most powerful leaders of the expellee lobby, had committed war crimes against Jews and Poles during World War II. Despite his past, on 10 December 1959, a statement was released to the press declaring that "Dr. Oberländer has the full confidence of the Adenauer cabinet". Other Christian Democrats made it clear to Adenauer that they would like to see Oberländer out of the cabinet, and finally in May 1960 Oberländer resigned.

Fourth government 

In 1961, Adenauer had his concerns about both the status of Berlin and US leadership confirmed, as the Soviets and East Germans built the Berlin Wall. Adenauer had come into the year distrusting the new US president, John F. Kennedy. He doubted Kennedy's commitment to a free Berlin and a unified Germany and considered him undisciplined and naïve. For his part, Kennedy thought that Adenauer was a relic of the past. Their strained relationship impeded effective Western action on Berlin during 1961.

The construction of the Berlin Wall in August 1961 and the sealing of borders by the East Germans made Adenauer's government look weak. Adenauer chose to remain on the campaign trail, and made a disastrous misjudgement in a speech on 14 August 1961 in Regensburg when he engaged in a personal attack on the SPD Mayor of West Berlin, Willy Brandt, saying that Brandt's illegitimate birth had disqualified him from holding any sort of office. After failing to keep their majority in the general election on 17 September, the CDU/CSU again needed to include the FDP in a coalition government. Adenauer was forced to make two concessions: to relinquish the chancellorship before the end of the new term, his fourth, and to replace his foreign minister. In his last years in office, Adenauer used to take a nap after lunch and, when he was traveling abroad and had a public function to attend, he sometimes asked for a bed in a room close to where he was supposed to be speaking, so that he could rest briefly before he appeared.

During this time, Adenauer came into conflict with the Economics Minister Ludwig Erhard over the depth of German integration to the West. Erhard was in favor of allowing Britain to join to create a trans-Atlantic free trade zone, while Adenauer was for strengthening ties amongst the original founding six nations of West Germany, France, the Netherlands, Belgium, Luxembourg and Italy. In Adenauer's viewpoint, the Cold War meant that the NATO alliance with the United States and Britain was essential, but there could be no deeper integration into a trans-Atlantic community beyond the existing military ties as that would lead to a "mishmash" between different cultural systems that would be doomed to failure. Though Adenauer had tried to get Britain to join the European Coal and Steel Community in 1951–52, by the early 1960s Adenauer had come to share General de Gaulle's belief that Britain simply did not belong in the EEC. The Élysée Treaty was signed in January 1963 to solidify relations with France.

In October 1962, a scandal erupted when police arrested five Der Spiegel journalists, charging them with espionage for publishing a memo detailing weaknesses in the West German armed forces. Adenauer had not initiated the arrests, but initially defended the person responsible, Defense Minister Franz Josef Strauss, and called the Spiegel memo "abyss of treason". After public outrage and heavy protests from the coalition partner FDP he dismissed Strauss, but the reputation of Adenauer and his party had already suffered.

Adenauer managed to remain in office for almost another year, but the scandal increased the pressure already on him to fulfill his promise to resign before the end of the term. Adenauer was not on good terms in his last years of power with his economics minister Ludwig Erhard and tried to block him from the chancellorship. In January 1963, Adenauer privately supported General Charles de Gaulle's veto of Britain's attempt to join the European Economic Community, and was only prevented from saying so openly by the need to preserve unity in his cabinet as most of his ministers led by Erhard supported Britain's application. A Francophile, Adenauer saw a Franco-German partnership as the key for European peace and prosperity and shared de Gaulle's view that Britain would be a disputative force in the EEC. Adenauer failed in his efforts to block Erhard as his successor, and in October 1963 he turned the office over to Erhard. He remained chairman of the CDU until his resignation in December 1966.

Adenauer ensured a generally free and democratic society, except the banning of the communist party and the BND spying on SPD on behalf of the CDU (see ), and laid the groundwork for Germany to re-enter the community of nations and to evolve as a dependable member of the Western world. It can be argued that because of Adenauer's policies, a later reunification of both German states was possible, and unified Germany has remained a solid partner in the European Union and NATO. The British historian Frederick Taylor argued that in many ways the Adenauer era was a transition period in values and viewpoints from the authoritarianism that characterized Germany in the first half of the 20th century to the more democratic values that characterized the western half of Germany in the second half of the 20th century.

Social policies 
Adenauer's years in the Chancellorship saw the realization of a number of important initiatives in the domestic field, such as in housing, pension rights, and unemployment provision. A major housebuilding programme was launched, while measures introduced to assist war victims and expellees. A savings scheme for homeownership was set up in 1952, while the Housebuilding Act of 1956 reinforced incentives for owner-occupation. Employer-funded child allowances for three or more children were established in 1954, and in 1957 the indexation of pension schemes was introduced, together with an old age assistance scheme for agricultural workers. The 1952 Maternity Leave Law foresaw 12 weeks of paid leave for working mothers, who were also safeguarded from unfair dismissal, and improvements in unemployment benefits were carried out. The Soldiers' Law of 1956 laid down that soldiers had the same rights as other citizens, "limited only by the demands of military service." Following a Federal Act of 1961, social assistance provided a safety net of minimum income "for those not adequately catered for by social insurance." Controversially, however, a school lunch programme was abolished in 1950.

Intelligence services and spying 
By the early 1960s, connections between the CDU under Adenauer and the intelligence services ("Bundesnachrichtendienst" / BND) had become significantly closer than would be generally known until more than 50 years later. Thanks to the BND, information on the internal machinations of the opposition SPD party were available to the entire CDU leadership, and not merely to Adenauer in his capacity as chancellor. It was Adenauer himself who personally instructed the BND to spy on his SPD rival, the future chancellor Willy Brandt.

Death and legacy 

Adenauer died on 19 April 1967 in his family home at Rhöndorf. According to his daughter, his last words were "" (Cologne dialect for "There's nothin' to weep about!").

Adenauer's state funeral in Cologne Cathedral was attended by a large number of international guests. One hundred countries were represented, they included:
  NATO Secretary General Manlio Brosio
  President Walter Hallstein from the European Commission
  President Lyndon B. Johnson from the United States
  President Charles de Gaulle from France
  Prime Minister Aldo Moro from Italy
  Prime Minister Pierre Werner from Luxembourg
  President Heinrich Lübke, Chancellor Kurt-Georg Kiesinger from West Germany
  Prime Minister Jens Otto Krag from Denmark
  Prime Minister Tage Erlander from Sweden
  Chancellor Josef Klaus from Austria
  Prime Minister Harold Wilson, former prime minister Harold Macmillan from the United Kingdom
  High Commissioner Vijaya Pandit from India

The funeral marked the first meeting between LBJ and de Gaulle since the state funeral of John F. Kennedy in Washington. After the Requiem Mass and service, his remains were taken upstream to Rhöndorf on the Rhine aboard the  Kondor of the German Navy, with two more, Seeadler and Sperber, as escorts, "past the thousands who stood in silence on both banks of the river". He is interred at the Waldfriedhof ("Forest Cemetery") at Rhöndorf.

When, in 1967, after his death at the age of 91, Germans were asked what they admired most about Adenauer, the majority responded that he had brought home the last German prisoners of war from the USSR, which had become known as the "Return of the 10,000".

In 2003, Adenauer was voted the 'greatest German of all time' in a contest called Unsere Besten ("Our Best") run on German public-service television broadcaster ZDF in which more than three million votes were cast.

Adenauer was the main motive for one of the most recent and famous gold commemorative coins: the Belgian 3 pioneers of the European unification commemorative coin, minted in 2002. The obverse side shows a portrait with the names Robert Schuman, Paul-Henri Spaak, and Konrad Adenauer; the three most important figures of the founding fathers of the European Union.

Distinctions

National orders 
 : Grand Cross, Special Class, of the Order of Merit of the Federal Republic of Germany (January 1954)
 : 4th class of the Order of the Red Eagle (1918)
 : Bavarian Order of Merit (May 1958)

Foreign orders 
 :
 Supreme Order of Christ (September 1963)
 Order of the Golden Spur (December 1955)
 Honorary Knight of the Teutonic Order (1958)
 Grand Cross of the Order of the Holy Sepulchre (1964)
 : Grand Cross of the Legion of Honour (1962)
 : Grand Cross of the Order of Isabella the Catholic (1967)
 :
 Grand Decoration of Honour of the Order for Services to the Republic of Austria (first Austrian republic, 1927)
 Grand Decoration of Honour in Gold with Sash for Services to the Republic of Austria (1956)
 : Grand Cross of the Order of Merit of the Italian Republic (1953)
 : Knight Grand Cross of the Order of St Michael and St George (1956)
 : Order of the Netherlands Lion (1960)
 : Knight of the Sovereign Military Order of Malta (1951)
 : Order of the Southern Cross (July 1953)
 : Order of the Liberator General San Martin
 : Order of the Sun (1953)
 : Order of the Condor of the Andes (1955)
 :
 Order of the Rising Sun, Grand Cordon (1960) – "because of his long-standing commitment to an understanding of the Japanese–German friendship, and for the peace and prosperity in the world"
 Order of the Rising Sun with Paulownia Flowers, Grand Cordon (1963)
 :
 Knight Grand Cross of the Order of Christ (24 January 1956)
 Knight Grand Cross of the Order of the Tower and Sword (1 October 1963)

Awards 
 Charlemagne Prize (Aachen, May 1954) – as a "powerful promoter of a united Europe"
 Man of the Year by the Time magazine (1953)

See also 
 List of German inventors and discoverers

Notes

References

Further reading 
 Bark, Dennis L., and David R. Gress. A History of West Germany. Vol. 1: From Shadow to Substance, 1945–1963. Vol. 2: Democracy and Its Discontents, 1963–1991 (1993), a standard scholarly history
 Brady, Steven J. Eisenhower and Adenauer: Alliance maintenance under pressure, 1953–1960 (Rowman & Littlefield, 2009).
 Craig, Gordon. From Bismarck to Adenauer: aspects of German statecraft (1958) pp 124–148 online.
 Craig, Gordon A. "Konrad Adenauer and His Diplomats." in The Diplomats, 1939-1979 (Princeton University Press, 2019) pp. 201–227. online
 Cudlipp, E. Adenauer (1985) online. for middle schools.
 Daugherty III, Leo J. "'Tip of the Spear': The Formation and Expansion of the Bundeswehr, 1949–1963." Journal of Slavic Military Studies 24.1 (2011): 147–177.
 Dönhoff, Marion. Foe into friend: the makers of the new Germany from Konrad Adenauer to Helmut Schmidt (1982) online
 Dülffer, Jost. "'No more Potsdam!' Konrad Adenauer's Nightmare and the Basis of his International Orientation." German Politics and Society 25.2 (2007): 19–42.
 
 Feldman, Lily Gardner. Germany's Foreign Policy of Reconciliation: From Enmity to Amity (Rowman & Littlefield; 2012) 393 pages; on German relations with France, Israel, Poland, and Czechoslovakia/the Czech Republic. excerpt
 
 
 
 
 Hanrieder, Wolfram F. Germany, America, Europe: Forty Years of German Foreign Policy (1989)
 Heidenheimer, Arnold J. Adenauer and the CDU: the Rise of the Leader and the Integration of the Party (1960)
 
 Hiscocks, Richard. The Adenauer Era (1966) online
 Kleuters, Joost. "Adenauer’s Long Shadow." in Reunification in West German Party Politics from Westbindung to Ostpolitik (Palgrave Macmillan, London, 2012) pp. 107–122.
 
 Maulucci Jr., Thomas W. Adenauer's Foreign Office: West German Diplomacy in the Shadow of the Third Reich (2012) excerpt
 Merk, Dorothea, and Rüdiger Ahrens. "'Suspicious Federal Chancellor' Versus 'Weak Prime Minister': Konrad Adenauer and Harold Macmillan in the British and West German Quality Press during the Berlin Crisis (1958 to 1962). A Critical Discourse Analysis." in Europe in Discourse: Identity, Diversity, Borders (2016) pp 101–116 online
 
 Rovan, Joseph. Konrad Adenauer (1987) 182 pages excerpt and text search
 Schwarz, Hans-Peter. "Adenauer’s Ostpolitik." in West German Foreign Policy: 1949-1979 (Routledge, 2020) pp. 127–143.
  online
 
 Schoenborn, Benedikt. "Bargaining with the bear: Chancellor Erhard's bid to buy German reunification, 1963–64." Cold War History 8.1 (2008): 23–53. online
 Schoenborn, Benedikt. "Chancellor Erhard's silent rejection of de Gaulle's plans: the example of monetary union." Cold War History 14.3 (2014): 377-402 online
 
 Witzthum, David. "David Ben-Gurion and Konrad Adenauer: Building a Bridge across the Abyss." Israel Journal of Foreign Affairs 13.2 (2019): 223–237.

Primary sources 
 Adenauer, Konrad. Memoirs, (4 vols. English edition 1966–70)
 McGhee, George C. At the creation of a new Germany: from Adenauer to Brandt : an ambassador's account (1989) online

External links 

 
 
 
 

 
1876 births
1967 deaths
20th-century Chancellors of Germany
20th-century German people
Centre Party (Germany) politicians
Chancellors of Germany
Eurofederalism
European integration pioneers
Foreign Ministers of Germany
German anti-communists
German anti-fascists
German autobiographers
German Roman Catholics
Grand Crosses of the Order of the Sun of Peru
Grand Croix of the Légion d'honneur
History of the European Union
Honorary Knights Grand Cross of the Order of St Michael and St George
Honorary Knights of the Teutonic Order
Knights Grand Cross of the Order of Isabella the Catholic
Knights Grand Cross with Collar of the Order of Merit of the Italian Republic
Knights of Malta
Knights of the Holy Sepulchre
Ludwig Maximilian University of Munich alumni
Mayors of Cologne
Members of the Bundestag for North Rhine-Westphalia
Members of the Prussian House of Lords
People from the Rhine Province
People of the Cold War
Grand Crosses in special issue of the Order of Merit of the Federal Republic of Germany
Recipients of the Grand Decoration with Sash for Services to the Republic of Austria
Recipients of the Order of the Liberator General San Martin
Recipients of the Order of the Rising Sun with Paulownia Flowers
Recipients of the Order of the Tower and Sword
Grand Crosses of the Order of Christ (Portugal)
Roman Catholics in the German Resistance
Prussian politicians
University of Bonn alumni
University of Freiburg alumni
Alterspräsidents of the Bundestag
Members of the Bundestag 1949–1953
Members of the Bundestag 1953–1957
Members of the Bundestag 1957–1961
Members of the Bundestag 1961–1965
Members of the Bundestag 1965–1969
Members of the Bundestag for the Christian Democratic Union of Germany
Members of Parlamentarischer Rat
Time Person of the Year
Recipients of Order of the Holy Trinity (Ethiopia)
Recipients of orders, decorations, and medals of Sudan